Kees de Vries (born 30 August 1955) is a German politician of the Christian Democratic Union (CDU) who served as a member of the Bundestag from the state of Saxony-Anhalt from 2013 until 2021.

Political career 
De Vries became a member of the Bundestag after the 2013 German federal election. He was a member of the Committee for Food and Agriculture. Vries did not stand for re-election in the 2021 German federal election.

References

External links 

 Bundestag biography 

1955 births
Living people
Members of the Bundestag for Saxony-Anhalt
Members of the Bundestag 2017–2021
Members of the Bundestag 2013–2017
Members of the Bundestag for the Christian Democratic Union of Germany